In This list of directors of ethnic Tamil origin. The names are ordered by the musicians' first or stage name.

 A. R. Rahman
 Yuvan Shankar Raja
 Anirudh Ravichander
 D. Imman
 Deva
 Devi Sri Prasad
 G. V. Prakash Kumar
 Gangai Amaren
 Ghibran
 Harris Jayaraj
 Hiphop Tamizha
 Ilayaraaja
 M. S. Viswanathan
 Premji Amaren
 S. P. Balasubrahmanyam
 Santhosh Narayanan
 Shruti Haasan
 Srikanth Deva 
 T. M. Soundararajan
 Thaman
 Vidyasagar
 Vijay Antony
 Vivek-Mervin
 Sean Roldan 
 Nivas Prasanna 
 Justin Prabhakaran
 C. Sathya
 James Vasanthan
 Dharan Kumar
 Dhina
 Bharathwaj
 Mani Sharma 
 T. Rajendar
  Sirpi 
 S. A. Rajkumar
 Devan Ekambaram
 Sundar C. Babu
 Aruldev
 Bhavatharini
 James Vasanthan
 Jassie Gift
 Joshua Sridhar
 Karthik
 Karthik Raja
 Pravin Mani
 A. R. Reihana
 Shankar–Ganesh
 Shankar Mahadevan
 Srinivas
 A. M. Rajah
 Chandrabose
  Shankar-Ganesh 
 Sam CS
 Silambarasan
 Karunaas
 K
 Kuralarasan
 Siddharth Vipin
 Bharani
 K. Bhagyaraj
 Black Pandi
 Raj–Koti
 K. V. Mahadevan
 M. M. Keeravani
 Raj–Koti
 R. P. Patnaik

References

Tamil musicians
Film music